Jei (Hausa: Unguwar Gaiya) is district of Zangon Kataf Local Government Area, southern Kaduna state in the Middle Belt region of Nigeria. The postal code for the area is 802130.

Settlements
 The following are some major settlements in Jei district include:
 Apyia Gbaza (H. Kangwaza)
 Apyinzwang
 Akputuut
 Ashong Ashyui (H. Jankasa)
 Atak Njei (H. Gidan Gata)
 Atyecarak (Attachirak; H. Kacecere)
 Awak
 Chenkwon (H. Samaru Kataf)
 Langson
 Madoo
 Magata (also Afan Tsaai)
 Magaya (H. Ung. Gaiya)
 Majuju (H. Ung. Juju)
 Makarau
 Makwakhwu (H. Kurmin Dawaki)
 Manchong
 Manyi Aminyam
 Manyi Ashyui
 Manta Ason
 Matagama
 Mavwuong
 Mayayit (H. Ung. Jaba)
 Sop Akoo (H. Mabushi) I, II

Demographics
The district is primarily made up of Atyap people, traditionally the territory of the Jei sub-clan of the Agbaat clan.

Economy
The economic base of the area is agriculture. However, there are other non-agricultural businesses operating especially in the bigger settlements such as Chenkwon (Samaru Kataf).

Note
 Achi, B.; Bitiyonɡ, Y. A.; Bunɡwon, A. D.; Baba, M. Y.; Jim, L. K. N.; Kazah-Toure, M.; Philips, J. E. "A Short History of the Atyap" (2019). Zaria: Tamaza Publishinɡ Co. Ltd. . Pp. 9–245.

See also
 Atak Nfang
 Atyap chiefdom
 Kanai
 List of villages in Kaduna State
 Zango Urban
 Zonzon

References

Populated places in Kaduna State
Atyap chiefdom